Madeleine Gagnon (born July 27, 1938) is a Quebec educator, literary critic and writer.

Biography 
She was born in Amqui in the valley of the Matapedia River and was educated at the Collège Notre-Dame d'Acadie in Moncton, at the Université de Montréal and the Université d'Aix-en-Provence. From 1969 to 1982, she taught literature at the Université du Québec à Montréal. She then was visiting professor and writer-in-residence at the Université de Montréal, at the Université de Sherbrooke, at the Université du Québec à Montréal and at the Université du Québec à Rimouski.

She wrote for the magazines Chroniques (which she founded with Patrick Straram), Liberté, La Nouvelle Barre du jour, Possibles, Osiris, Estuaire, Urgences, Passages, and Actuels. In 1986, her book Les Fleurs du Catalpa received the Grand Prix de poésie from the Journal de Montréal, Her poetry collection Chant pour un Québec lointain received the Governor General's Award for French-language poetry, the Prix Arthur-Buies from the Salon du livre de Rimouski and the Prix Artquimédia from the town of Amqui. In 2002, she was awarded the Prix Athanase-David. Gagnon was named a member of the Académie des lettres du Québec in 1987.

Selected works 
 La venue à l'écriture, feminist essays (1976) with Hélène Cixous and Annie Leclerc
 La terre est remplie de langage, poetry (1993)
 Le Deuil du soleil, autobiographical novel (1998), nominated for Governor General's Award for French-language fiction
 Rêve de pierre, poetry (1999)
 Les femmes et la guerre, essay (2001), received the Prix Marcel-Couture
 Le chant de la terre, poetry anthology covering the period 1978-2002 (2002)

References 

1938 births
Living people
Canadian poets in French
Canadian novelists in French
Governor General's Award-winning poets
Canadian women poets
Canadian women novelists
20th-century Canadian novelists
20th-century Canadian poets
20th-century Canadian women writers
21st-century Canadian poets
21st-century Canadian women writers
Canadian women essayists
Writers from Quebec
Université de Montréal alumni
University of the Mediterranean alumni
Academic staff of the Université de Montréal
Academic staff of the Université du Québec à Montréal
Academic staff of the Université de Sherbrooke
20th-century Canadian essayists
21st-century Canadian essayists